Jean Gagnon (May 21, 1941 – December 23, 2016) was the Roman Catholic bishop of the Roman Catholic Diocese of Gaspé, Quebec, Canada.

Ordained to the priesthood in 1966, Gagnon was named bishop in 1998 and retired in 2016, five months before his death.

See also
Catholic Church in Canada

References

1941 births
2016 deaths
21st-century Roman Catholic bishops in Canada
20th-century Roman Catholic bishops in Canada
Roman Catholic bishops of Gaspé